Marreco is a surname. Notable people with the surname include:
Anne Marreco (1912–1982), pen name of Anne Wignall, English socialite and author
Anthony Marreco (1915–2006), British barrister
Barbara Freire-Marreco (1879–1967), English anthropologist and folklorist
Lady Ursula Marreco (1916–2017), English socialite and aristocrat
Tozé Marreco (born 1987), Portuguese footballer

See also
Marreco Futsal, a Brazilian futsal club